The No. 1 Ladies' Detective Agency is a series of radio programmes, based on the series of novels of the same name by Alexander McCall Smith.

McCall Smith himself dramatised the series for BBC Radio 4. Thirty-five episodes have been broadcast, the first on 10 September 2004, and the most recent on 23 September 2019. The episodes encompass the first to the nineteenth books. Claire Benedict plays Mma Ramotswe for most of the episodes up to 2016, with Janice Acquah playing the lead for the 2010 episodes, and from 2017 onwards.

Episodes

References

BBC Radio dramas
Radio series
BBC Radio 4 programmes